Norbert Bíró (born 5 March 1974) is a retired Hungarian Paralympic judoka. He was a bronze medalist at the 2004 Summer Paralympics in Athens and won the European Championship in 1999. He now coaches the Hungarian Youth Judo Team and has coached 2018 Summer Youth Olympics bronze medalist Zsombor Vég and gold medalist Szofi Özbas. His older brother Tamás Bíró is also a judo coach for the Youth Team.

References

1974 births
Living people
People from Cegléd
Paralympic judoka of Hungary
Judoka at the 2000 Summer Paralympics
Judoka at the 2004 Summer Paralympics
Medalists at the 2004 Summer Paralympics
Sportspeople from Pest County
Hungarian male judoka
21st-century Hungarian people